Mikhalakis Tymbios (born December 15, 1948) is a Cypriot sport shooter. He competed at the Summer Olympics in 1984 and 1988. In 1984, he placed 69th in the mixed skeet event, and in 1988, he tied for 20th place in the mixed skeet event.

References

1948 births
Living people
Skeet shooters
Cypriot male sport shooters
Shooters at the 1984 Summer Olympics
Shooters at the 1988 Summer Olympics
Olympic shooters of Cyprus
Shooters at the 1982 Commonwealth Games
Commonwealth Games competitors for Cyprus